The Central District of Torkaman County is a district (bakhsh) in Torkaman County, Golestan Province, Iran. At the 2006 census, its population was 63,493, in 13,467 families.  The District has one city: Bandar Torkaman.  The District has one rural district (dehestan): Jafarbay-ye Jonubi Rural District.

References 

Districts of Golestan Province
Torkaman County